The South American Junior Rugby Championship is an annual rugby union competition that features teams from South America. The tournament began in 1972 with Argentina as the host, which saw the locals win the title. It was not until 2008 when the first official Division B tournament was held, which was eventually won by Brazil. In 2014, an addition competition was added, CONSUR Cup, which is contested by Argentina and the top team of the A Division the same year.

In 1999, it changed the minimum age permitted from U18 to U19. Since 2004, the tournament champion (excluding Argentina) qualifies to the next year´s World Rugby Under 20 Trophy organised by the World Rugby. Argentina automatically qualifies for the World Rugby Under 20 Championship.

Current divisions (2015)

Results

Junior Consur Cup

Past Tournaments 1972–2014

Division A

Past Tournaments 2008–2014

Division B

See also
 Sudamérica Rugby

References

External links
Sudamerica Rugby Website

South American Rugby Championship
1972 establishments in South America
Rugby union competitions in South America
Under-20 rugby union competitions